Mary O'Connell may refer to:
 Mary O'Connell (nurse), Roman Catholic religious sister and nurse during the American Civil War
 Mary O'Connell (1778–1836), wife of Daniel O'Connell
 Mary J. O'Connell, evolutionary genomicist
 Mary Ellen O'Connell, professor of law